The Ministry of Public Administration and Local Self-Government of the Government of Serbia is the ministry in the Government of Serbia which is in the charge of public administration and local self-government. The current minister is Aleksandar Martinović, who has been in office since 26 October 2022.

History
The Ministry of Public Administration and Local Self-Government was established on 11 February 1997.

2011–14: Merged ministries
In 2011, the Ministry of Public Administration and Local Self-Government was added the Ministry of Human and Minority Rights, and it was named the Ministry of Human and Minority Rights, Public Administration and Local Self-Government until 2012.

From 2012 to 2014, the Public Administration was within the Ministry of Justice and Public Administration under Nikola Selaković. Also, the Local Self-Government became part of the Ministry of Regional Development and Local Self-Government under Verica Kalanović from 2012 to 2013. Regional Development was split from the Ministry of Economy. From 2013 to 2014 Igor Mirović led the Ministry of Regional Development and Local Self-Government.

2014–present: Reunified ministry
In 2014, Kori Udovički took the reunified ministry of Public Administration and Local Self-Government from Selaković and Mirović.

Secretaries of State
There are currently four secretaries of state in the ministry: Stevan Gligorin, Maja Mačužić Puzić, Dragana Potpara, and Čedomir Rakić.

Subordinate agencies
There are several agencies that operate within the Ministry:
 Directorate for E-government
 Administrative Inspectorate
 Professional services of administrative districts

List of ministers
Political Party:

References

External links
 
 Serbian ministries, etc – Rulers.org

Public Administration and Local Self-Government
1997 establishments in Serbia
Ministries established in 1997
Serbia